The men's decathlon event at the 1994 World Junior Championships in Athletics was held in Lisbon, Portugal, at Estádio Universitário de Lisboa on 20 and 21 July.  Senior implements (106.7 cm (3'6) hurdles, 7257g shot, 2 kg discus) were used.

Medalists

Results

Final
20/21 July

Participation
According to an unofficial count, 28 athletes from 23 countries participated in the event.

References

Decathlon
Combined events at the World Athletics U20 Championships